The Downtown Majestic (formerly known as "Downtown") is a center for cultural, musical or educational events and meetings.

It is a historical heritage of the city of Bogota, built in 1938, originally called Teatro Mogador, and since 2007 began to be called Downtown Majestic, and has been specifically adapted to host events. Others have lockers for events, telephones, dressing rooms, food bars, bathrooms, private boxes and dependent income.
During the year 2016 was remodeled and by 2017 began to call Auditorium Mayor Cun.

Concerts
Today this complex is used for organizing concerts due to the versatility of the place. Among the artists presented in this exhibition they are :

See also
Teatro Metropol de Bogotá
Teatro Royal Center

Theatres in Colombia
Buildings and structures in Bogotá
Tourist attractions in Bogotá